Joe Savikataaq (born ) is a Canadian politician who served as the fifth premier of Nunavut from 2018 to 2021. He was elected premier on June 14, 2018 by the Legislative Assembly of Nunavut, after his predecessor Paul Quassa lost a no-confidence vote.

Politics 
Savikataaq was first elected to the Legislative Assembly of Nunavut in the 2013 election and represents the electoral district of Arviat South. He was re-elected in the same district in 2017.

Savikataaq served in numerous political positions since entering politics. These include Deputy Premier of Nunavut, Minister of Economic Development and Transportation of Nunavut, Minister of Community and Government Services of Nunavut, and Minister of Energy of Nunavut.

Savikataaq was elected as premier on June 14, 2018. He was re-elected in the 2021 election. P.J. Akeeagok was selected to become premier in the Nunavut Leadership Forum on November 17, 2021 defeating Savikataaq.

Personal life
Prior to politics, Savikataaq worked as a conservation officer for almost 30 years. He is a scuba diver and a small airplane pilot.

He is married to Susan Savikataaq, and has 3 children, Joe Jr., Wendy, and Jamie. He has 9 grandchildren.

His son, Joe Savikataaq Jr., became mayor of Arviat in March 2020 following the death of Bob Leonard.

References

1960 births
Living people
Members of the Executive Council of Nunavut
Members of the Legislative Assembly of Nunavut
Inuit from the Northwest Territories
Inuit politicians
People from Arviat
21st-century Canadian politicians
Inuit from Nunavut
Premiers of Nunavut
Deputy premiers of Nunavut